Theanne Griffith is an American neuroscientist and children's book author. She is an assistant professor of Physiology and Membrane Biology at the University of California, Davis.

Background 
Theanne Griffith was born in Pennsylvania in 1986. Her mother and father were both professors; her mother taught sociology and her father taught economics. Griffith was raised in Springfield, Virginia, and attended West Potomac High School.

Education    
Griffith graduated from Smith College in 2008 where she majored in neuroscience and Spanish. At Smith, Griffith participated in scientific research all four years of her undergraduate career. The work that Griffith did at Smith involved GABA receptors and their roles as anesthetic targets to understand menthol and propofol. This was done using two-electrode voltage clamps. Also during her time at Smith, Griffith was able to study abroad at Pontifical Catholic University of Chile in 2007. There, she used biochemical techniques in her research, such as western blots and transgenic mouse models. Griffith was later invited back to the university in Chile for a post-baccalaureate program from 2008 to 2010.

Griffith returned to the United States and attended Northwestern University for her Ph.D. in Neuroscience, where she worked under Geoffrey T. Swanson. Her research involved a return to electrophysiology, using the patch clamp technique to measure the electric current of glutamate receptors and to investigate the modulation of receptor tyrosine kinases by auxiliary protein subunits.

Career and research 

During her postdocal training, Griffith joined Ellen Lumpkin's lab at Columbia University in the Department of Physiology & Cellular Biophysics, where she researched mechanosensation and how tactile sensations are sent. Griffith's postdoctoral research specifically examined the role of tetrodotoxin-sensitive sodium channels on action potentials in the presence of menthol-sensitive vesicular glutamate transporter 3 activity. In short, Griffith found that compared to menthol-insensitive Vglut3 neurons, menthol-sensitive Vglut3 neurons have a more heightened excitability. This phenomenon is intensified for menthol-sensitive neurons when tetrodotoxin-sensitive sodium channels subunits drive action potential firing. Taken together, these results provide a neurological explanation for the historical use of menthol as an analgesic and fever reducer.

Griffith's first academic appointment was in the department of Pharmacology, Physiology & Neuroscience at Rutgers University as an instructor from 2019 to 2020. She then joined the Department of Physiology and Membrane Biology at the University of California, Davis as an assistant professor in the Department of Physiology and Membrane Biology in 2020, where she is still on the faculty today. The Griffith Lab studies mammalian thermosensation to determine which ion channels are critical in health and disease. A variety of methodological techniques are used in the lab including patch clamp, molecular profiling, as well as a variety of imaging and genomic techniques on primarily mice model organisms. Griffith found that Nav1.1 is a critical mediator of excitability, suggesting that it could be contributing to cold-sensing in vivo.

Honors and awards 
(source)
 2020: University of California, Davis CAMPOS Faculty Scholars
 2018: Columbia University First Prize Poster Presentation Award Recipient, Thompson Family Foundation 3rd Annual Symposium in Translational Sensory Neuroscience
2016: Biophysical Society Inclusion and Diversity Travel Award
2013 - 2014: Northwestern University Center for Leadership, Leadership Fellow
2013: Harvard Medical School New England Science Symposium, Ruth and William Silen, M.D. First Prize Poster Presentation Award Recipient
2013: Northwestern University Kellogg School of Management Management for Scientists and Engineers Certificate Program
2012: Cold Spring Harbor Laboratory Ion Channel Physiology Summer Course
2011 - 2014: Society for Neuroscience Neuroscience Scholars Program, Diversity Fellow

Books 
In addition to her research, Griffith wrote The Magnificent Makers, a STEM-themed children's book series targeted towards children ages 7–10. Griffith began writing her first series, The Magnificent Makers while on maternity leave. The series was nominated for the Kid's Book Choice Award and the Florida Sunshine State Young Reader's Award in 2021. The series comprises six books: How to Test a Friendship, Brain Trouble, Riding Sound Waves, The Great Germ Hunt, Race Through Space and Storm Chasers'''. The books include interactive exercises and at-home experiments for readers to complete. In the School Library Journal, Jessica Trafton described How to Test a Friendship as “great for kids who are looking for an adventure that isn’t scary. The science theme is fun, educational, and age-appropriate for the intended audience.” Griffith also co-authored the Ada Twist, Scientist: The Why Files series - a non-fiction series following a black girl scientist. It is the novel companion to the Netflix show, Ada Twist, Scientist. Both the Netflix show and the novel are based on the original picture-book series Ada Twist, Scientist. The three books in the series are Exploring Flight, All About Plants!, and The Science of Baking. Griffith has had stories and interviews published about her in news outlets such as NPR and Today.

 Published work 

 The Magnificent Makers: How to Test a Friendship,   Random House,  2020. 
 The Magnificent Makers: Brain Trouble,   Random House,  2020. 
 The Magnificent Makers: Riding Sound Waves,   Random House,  2020. 
 The Magnificent Makers: The Great Germ Hunt,   Random House,  2021. 
 Ada Twist, Scientist: The Why Files: Exploring Flight,   Amulet Books,  2021. 

  The Magnificent Makers: Race Through Space,   Random House,  2022. 
 Ada Twist, Scientist: All About Plants,   Amulet Books,  2022. 
 Ada Twist, Scientist: The Science of Baking,   Amulet Books,  2022. 
 The Magnificent Makers: Storm Chasers,''   Random House,  2022.

References

American women neuroscientists
African-American biologists
21st-century American women scientists
21st-century American biologists
21st-century African-American scientists
American women children's writers
African-American children's writers
University of California, Davis faculty
People from Springfield, Virginia
1986 births
Living people
African-American women scientists
African-American women writers
21st-century African-American women
Smith College alumni
Pontifical Catholic University of Chile alumni
Scientists from California
Writers from California